Rose Shapiro is a British writer who contributes regularly to several publications including The Independent, The Observer, The Guardian, Time Out, Good Housekeeping and the Health Service Journal.  She wrote the book Suckers: How Alternative Medicine Makes Fools of Us All.

She lives in Bristol and has two daughters, Isabel and Judith. Her late husband Sam Organ was a television producer for BBC Bristol.

Books
Suckers: How alternative medicine makes fools of us all, Vintage Books 2008,

References

External links
 
 

Living people
English writers
English women non-fiction writers
English women journalists
Year of birth missing (living people)